Guppya gundlachi is a species of gastropods belonging to the family Euconulidae.

The species is found in Central America.

References

Euconulidae